Lake Siegel Bell (born March 24, 1979) is an American actress, screenwriter and director. She has starred in various television series, including Boston Legal (2004–2006), Surface (2005–2006), How to Make It in America (2010–2011), Childrens Hospital (2008–2016), and Bless This Mess (2019–2020) and in films including Over Her Dead Body (2008), What Happens in Vegas (2008), It's Complicated (2009), No Strings Attached (2011), Million Dollar Arm (2014), No Escape (2015), Man Up (2015), The Secret Life of Pets (2016), Shot Caller (2017), and Home Again (2017).

She wrote and directed the short film Worst Enemy, which debuted at the Sundance Film Festival in 2012, followed by her 2013 feature film directing debut In a World..., in which she also starred. In 2017, she directed, wrote, co-produced and starred in I Do... Until I Don't. Bell has also voiced Poison Ivy in the HBO Max series Harley Quinn (2019–present) and Black Widow in the Disney+ series What If...? (2021).

Early life
Bell was born in New York City. Her mother, Robin Bell, owns the design firm Robin Bell Design in New York. Her father is real estate developer Harvey Siegel. He bought the Virginia International Raceway after it had closed, and converted it to a racetrack country club. He also owned New Jersey Motorsports Park.

Bell's father is Jewish and her mother is Protestant. Bell has stated that she was raised in a "comically dysfunctional" family.

Bell attended The Chapin School in New York and Westminster School in Simsbury, Connecticut. As a high school junior, Bell attended School Year Abroad (SYA) at its school located in Rennes, France. For part of her teenage years, she lived in Vero Beach, Florida and attended Saint Edwards School. She attended Skidmore College in Saratoga Springs, New York, but decided to focus on acting and transferred to Rose Bruford College in London, which emphasized theater and the arts. 

At Rose Bruford, she acted in theatrical productions including The Seagull, The Children's Hour, Six Degrees of Separation, Light Shining in Buckinghamshire and The Pentecost.

Career

Actress
After returning to the United States, Bell began her career in 2002 with roles in the film Speakeasy, a film about two men who become unlikely friends after a minor traffic accident, and in two episodes of the medical TV drama ER. Her first significant roles came in 2003. After appearing in the psychological thriller I Love Your Work, she was cast alongside Jeff Goldblum as the female lead in the NBC television film War Stories. She next played Alicia Silverstone's wisecracking best friend, Victoria Carlson, in NBC's comedy-drama series Miss Match. In 2004, Bell appeared in the wrestling film Slammed and made her debut as Sally Heep in the final four episodes of the series The Practice. Her character was carried over into the spinoff Boston Legal, where she was a regular cast member until she left the series in 2005. She also appeared alongside Dustin Hoffman in an Audi commercial that spoofed his well-known film The Graduate.

Bell played the lead role in the science fiction series Surface, which aired between September 2005 and May 2006. She also star in the film Rampage: The Hillside Strangler Murders (2006) about the Hillside Strangler of the late 1970s; and returned to Boston Legal for two episodes, reprising her role as Sally Heep, opposing counsel to Alan Shore (portrayed by James Spader). In 2008, she played the female lead in the thriller Under Still Waters, for which she won the Newport Beach Film Festival Award for Outstanding Performance in Acting. She also starred alongside Paul Rudd and Eva Longoria in the romantic comedy Over Her Dead Body, played the best friend of Cameron Diaz's character in the romantic comedy What Happens in Vegas; and played the wife of Colin Farrell's character in the crime drama Pride and Glory.

She was cast as the lead female role, Dr. Cat Black, in Rob Corddry's satirical comedy Childrens Hospital. The fourth season began airing in August 2012 and featured two episodes that were directed by Bell: the season premiere, "The Boy with the Pancakes Tattoo", a parody of the film The Girl With the Dragon Tattoo; and the ninth episode, "A Kid Walks in to a Hospital".

In 2009, Bell voiced the role of Dana Mercer in the video game Prototype. That year she also played Alec Baldwin's wife in the romantic comedy It's Complicated and guest starred in an episode of the fourth season of the series Wainy Days. In 2010 Bell voiced a supporting role in Shrek Forever After, starred in the satirical film Burning Palms, guest starred in an episode of the second season of the sitcom The League, and was cast as a lead character in the HBO series How to Make It in America, which aired for two seasons from February 2010 to November 2011. Bell was to play Deputy Judy Hicks in Scream 4, but dropped out four days before filming due to scheduling conflicts, with the role going to Marley Shelton.

In 2011, Bell starred alongside Josh Lucas and Terrence Howard in the supernatural thriller Little Murder, played Ashton Kutcher's boss in the romantic comedy No Strings Attached, a performance that won her critical praise and was called "scene-stealing"; starred in the ensemble comedy A Good Old Fashioned Orgy; and guest starred in an episode of the first season of New Girl. 

Bell had a lead role alongside Kate Bosworth in the 2012 thriller Black Rock.

In 2021, Bell lent her voice to the adult animated film Cryptozoo.

Writer and director
In 2010, Bell made her writing and directing début with the short film Worst Enemy, which starred Michaela Watkins, Matt Walsh and Lindsay Sloane. Her film débuted at the 2011 Sundance Film Festival and has also played at the Nantucket Film Festival, the Dallas International Film Festival, the Gen Art Film Festival and Aspen Shortsfest, winning the Tony Cox Award for Screenwriting in a Short Film from Nantucket and receiving a Shorts Jury Special Mention from Dallas. Her film led to her being named one of the "2012 Inspiring Filmmakers" by LUNAFEST. Speaking on the film, Bell stated:

"The film is about a milk-drinking, lactose-intolerant misanthrope on a quest for real human connection. Being an ordinary, unoriginal and unloved woman, she instead becomes so wrapped up in her own quiet neurosis that she finds herself physically stuck in a full body girdle. I wrote and directed Worst Enemy in 2010 as an experiment to see if I could take on being a filmmaker".

Bell made her writing and directing feature film debut at the 2013 Sundance Film Festival with In a World.... which she wrote and directed and in which she starred. She describes the film as "a comedy about a female voice-over artist and family dysfunction and relationships. I’m obsessed with the voice-over world, so it makes sense for me." The film was picked up by Roadside Attractions and Sony. In February 2014 she said her next project would be What's the Point? (And Other Fair Questions About Marriage), a film she would write and direct, which was eventually renamed I Do... Until I Don't and released in 2017 to mixed reviews.

Bell also has a number of television directing credits, including two 2017 episodes of the Hulu comedy-drama series Casual, two 2019 episodes of the ABC sitcom Bless This Mess (a show in which she co-created and starred), and two episodes of the 2022 Hulu biographical miniseries Pam & Tommy.

Modeling

Bell was listed as number 45 on Femme Fatales' list of the 50 Sexiest Women of 2003; 6th on British Vogue's list of the 10 Best Dressed Women of 2007, 32nd on Maxim's Hot 100 of 2008, 44th on Maxim's Hot 100 of 2012 and 89th on AskMen's 99 Most Desirable Women of 2012.

In 2007, Bell appeared in a photo shoot for GQ; in 2008 she appeared in a photo shoot for Marie Claire; in 2009 she modeled for Scott Caan, for his first book, Scott Caan Photographs, Vol. 1; and in 2011 she appeared in photo shoots for Elle, Los Angeles, Maxim and Esquire, the latter in conjunction with the website Me In My Place. In September 2011, Bell modeled at Pirelli's Fashion Week in Milan, Italy. For New York Fashion Week 2013, Bell modeled nude with strategic body painting (done by her husband) on the cover of New York shot by Mark Seliger. In April 2014, Bell appeared in Esquire for the second time.

Other activities
Bell has an automotive column in The Hollywood Reporter called Test Drive and is the magazine's automotive contributing editor. In 2022, her book Inside Voice—on the topic of the human voice—was published.

Personal life
In 2011, Bell began dating Scott Campbell, an artist and tattoo artist. The two met when he played himself in an episode of the second season of How to Make It in America. The couple became engaged on Bell's birthday in March 2012 and were married on June 1, 2013, at the Marigny Opera House in New Orleans, Louisiana. In late October 2014, her representative confirmed that Bell had given birth to their daughter, Nova. In May 2017, Bell gave birth to their second child, a son named Ozgood. In October 2020, the couple announced that they were separating, with Bell filing for divorce on October 28, 2020. On July 7, 2022 it was reported that Bell started dating comedian and actor Chris Rock.

Filmography

Film

Television

Video games

References

External links

 
 
 

1979 births
21st-century American actresses
Actresses from Florida
Actresses from New York City
Alumni of Rose Bruford College
American film actresses
Screenwriters from New York (state)
American television actresses
American television directors
American women television directors
American voice actresses
American women film directors
American women screenwriters
Chapin School (Manhattan) alumni
Living people
People from New York City
People from Vero Beach, Florida
Skidmore College alumni
Westminster School (Connecticut) alumni
Film directors from New York City
Film directors from Florida
Jewish American actresses
Jewish American screenwriters
Screenwriters from Florida
Screenwriters from Connecticut
Comedy film directors
21st-century American Jews